Kew Baptist Church was an independent evangelical fellowship affiliated to the Association of Grace Baptist Churches (South East). The church met, until its closure in 2020, in Windsor Road in Kew in the London Borough of Richmond upon Thames, south west London. 

The church was founded in 1861 in Richmond, as Salem Baptist Church. It met at 5 Parkshot, a Grade II listed building near Richmond Green. The church moved to Windsor Road, Kew in 1973 and changed its name to Kew Baptist Church in 1990.

The church members unanimously affirmed a motion to dissolve the church as of 31 December 2020.

Notes

References

Sources

External links

1970 photograph of Salem Baptist Church, 5-6 Parkshot, Richmond, from London County Council Photograph Library collection in London Metropolitan Archives
Churches Together in Kew

1861 establishments in England
2020 disestablishments in England
Churches completed in 1973
Former churches in Kew
Former churches in the London Borough of Richmond upon Thames
Richmond, London